Dane Milovanović (born 2 December 1989) is an Australian footballer who most recently played for Madura United in the Liga 1 as a defender or midfielder. He currently plays for Sydenham Park SC in Victoria’s State League 1.

Club career

Youth
Dane Milovanović went to the AIS as a 2008 Scholarship Holder. He then joined the youth squad of Adelaide United and Brisbane Roar FC. While in Adelaide he had a short stint at Adelaide Cobras in the FFSA Premier League. He later signed for Oakleigh Cannons in the Victorian Premier League.

Adelaide United
In 2010, he was member of Adelaide United. It participates in the A-League as the sole team from the state of South Australia. Adelaide is one of the most successful clubs in the A-League. Adelaide competed in the AFC Champions League in 2010 after finishing second on the A-League league table. At Adelaide United he managed to claim the National Youth League player of the season.

Sun Hei
In August 2011, he signed to play for Sun Hei of Hong Kong. He made his debut for Sun Hei on 3 September 2011 against Kitchee.

On 7 January 2011, in the top of the table clash against TSW Pegasus, Milovanović came on as a second-half substitute, but was sent off after two bookable offences as Sun Hei lost 1–3. He was the second Sun Hei player sent off in the match after Kilama. On 28 April 2012, it was revealed that he had already left Sunhei.
He also played a pivotal role for Sun Hei in the Senior Shield Cup final help at the HongKong National Stadium, scoring the only goal for Sun Hei as they managed to win the game 5–4 on penalties to beat South China and claim the trophy.

Ballarat Red Devils
On 12 March 2014, Milovanovic was announced in the finalised Ballarat Red Devils squad for their inaugural National Premier League Victoria season. He left Ballarat in a midseason move to Maldives side New Radiant SC in June 2014.

South Melbourne
South Melbourne announced his signing ahead of the 2015 NPLV season on 22 December 2014.

Hong Kong Pegasus FC
In September 2015, Dane Milovanović joined Pegasus of Hong Kong.
 However, in December 2015, FIFA Disciplinary Committee decided that Dane Milovanovic will be banned world-wide for 12 games. Pegasus terminated Dane Milovanović then.

Madura United
In May 2016, Dane Milovanović joined Madura United. Then, in July 2017 he was released by Madura United due to being diagnosed with anxiety disorder.

Sydenham Park SC

In January 2022, Dane signed for Sydenham Park in Victoria’s state league 1. Dane is a marquee player and crowd favourite.

International career
Dane Milovanović has represented Australia at Under-17, Under-20 and under-23 levels. In 2008, he has selected to play for the Australia national under-20 association football team to play in the 2008 AFF U-19 Youth Championship which was held in Thailand from 5–11 October 2008. Australia won the tournament. In 2010, he has selected to play for the Australia Olympic football team against Japan and Hong Kong in friendly match.

Personal life
He was born in Australia and is of Serbian descent.

Honours

Club
Sun Hei
Hong Kong Senior Challenge Shield: 2011–12

International
Australia U20
AFF U-19 Youth Championship: 2008

References

External links
Pelita Bandung Raya profile
Dane Milovanović at HKFA

1989 births
Living people
Australian soccer players
Australian expatriate soccer players
Australian people of Serbian descent
Australian Institute of Sport soccer players
Adelaide Cobras FC players
Oakleigh Cannons FC players
Sun Hei SC players
Pelita Bandung Raya players
Bentleigh Greens SC players
Ballarat City FC players
New Radiant S.C. players
South Melbourne FC players
TSW Pegasus FC players
Madura United F.C. players
Green Gully SC players
Preston Lions FC players
Heidelberg United FC players
FFSA Super League players
Liga 1 (Indonesia) players
Dhivehi Premier League players
Hong Kong First Division League players
Expatriate footballers in Indonesia
Expatriate footballers in the Maldives
Expatriate footballers in Hong Kong
Australian expatriate sportspeople in Indonesia
Australian expatriate sportspeople in Hong Kong
Association football midfielders
National Premier Leagues players